Tipat cantok  is a Balinese popular local dish. It is made of various boiled or blanched vegetables with ketupat rice cake, served in spicy peanut sauce. In Balinese language tipat means ketupat, while cantok means grounding ingredients using mortar and pestle. Vegetables usually being used in this dish are asparagus bean, beansprout, water spinach, and tofu. This is a common street food, which is popular among tourists as well as locals. 

Tipat or ketupat is a rice cake which often serves as a replacement for rice. The peanut sauce might be mild or hot and spicy, depends on the addition of chili pepper. Usually bawang goreng fried shallot are sprinkled upon the dish, also addition of kecap manis sweet soy sauce. It is one of a few Balinese vegetarian dishes. Tipat cantok is akin to Javanese pecel and Jakartan gado-gado.

See also

 Indonesian cuisine
 Gado-gado
 Pecel

References

Balinese cuisine